Omphalotropis albocarinata is a species of minute salt marsh snail with an operculum, a terrestrial gastropod mollusk, or micromollusk, in the family Assimineidae. 

This species is endemic to Norfolk Island.

References

External links
 Mousson, A. (1873). Faune malacologique de quelques îles de l'océan Pacifique occidental. Journal de Conchyliologie, 21: 101-116, pl. 7. Paris
 Sykes, E. R. (1900). Notes on the non-marine Mollusca of Norfolk and Phillip Islands, with descriptions of new species. Proceedings of the Malacological Society of London. 4: 139-147
 T. (1945). The land Mollusca of Norfolk Island. The Australian Zoologist. 11: 46-71

Gastropods of Norfolk Island
Assimineidae
Gastropods described in 1873